Surveillance & Society is an open-access, peer-reviewed academic journal covering research on surveillance. It was established in 2002 by David Murakami Wood (Queen's University at Kingston), Kirstie S. Ball (University of St. Andrews), Clive Norris (University of Sheffield), David Lyon (Queen's University at Kingston), and Stephen Graham (Newcastle University), and is published by the Surveillance Studies Network. The editors-in-chief are Torin Monahan (University of North Carolina at Chapel Hill) and David Murakami Wood (Queen's University at Kingston).

Abstracting and indexing
The journal is abstracted and indexed in:

References

External links
 

English-language journals
Quarterly journals
Creative Commons Attribution-licensed journals
Multidisciplinary social science journals
Surveillance
Publications established in 2002